This is a list of fantasy authors, authors known for writing works of fantasy, fantasy literature, or related genres of magic realism, horror fiction, science fantasy. Many of the authors are known for work outside the fantasy genres.

A 

 Ben Aaronovitch, (born 1964) author of Peter Grant (book series)
 Rafael Ábalos, (born 1956) is author of Grimpow
 Lynn Abbey, (born 1948)
 Joe Abercrombie, (born 1974) author of The First Law series
 Daniel Abraham, (born 1969) author of The Dagger and the Coin series
 Douglas Adams, (1952–2001) author of The Hitchhiker's Guide to the Galaxy series
 Richard Adams, (1920–2016) author of Watership Down
 Katherine Addison, pen name for Sarah Monette, author of The Goblin Emperor
 Tomi Adeyemi, (born 1993) author of the Legacy of Orïsha trilogy
 Alexandra Adornetto, (born 1992) author of The Strangest Adventures series
 Joan Aiken, (1924–2004) author of The Wolves of Willoughby Chase
 Tim Akers (born 1972)
 Wendy Alec, author of the Chronicles of Brothers series
 Lloyd Alexander, (1924–2007) author of the Chronicles of Prydain
 Alan Burt Akers, pseudonym of Kenneth Bulmer (1921–2005)
 Hans Christian Andersen, (1805–1875) authored fairy tales, including The Little Mermaid
 Poul Anderson, (1926–2001) author of The Broken Sword
 Ilona Andrews, husband and wife writing team, author of the Kate Daniels series and The Edge series
 F. Anstey, (1856–1934) author of Vice Versa
 Piers Anthony, (born 1934) author of Xanth
 K.A. Applegate, (born 1956) author of Everworld
 Katherine Arden, (born 1987) author of the Winternight trilogy
 Tom Arden, (1961–2015)
 Kelley Armstrong, (born 1968) author of the Women of the Otherworld
Jennifer L. Armentrout (born 1980) author of From Blood and Ash
 Danilo Arona, (born 1950)
 Catherine Asaro, (born 1955)
 Mike Ashley, (born 1948) 
 Nancy Asire, (born 1945) 
 Robert Lynn Asprin, (1946–2008) author of the Myth Adventures and contributing author to Thieves World
 Tomi Adeyemi, (born 1993) author of Children of Blood and Bone
 A. A. Attanasio, (born 1951) author of Radix
 Amelia Atwater-Rhodes, (born 1984) author of In the Forests of the Night
 Anselm Audley, (born 1982) author of the Aquasilva series
 Jean M. Auel, author of the Earth's Children books
 Fiona Avery, (born 1974)
 Victoria Aveyard, (born 1990) author of the Red Queen series

B 

 Robin Wayne Bailey, (born 1952) author of the Frost trilogy, Brothers of the Dragon trilogy, Dragonkin trilogy, Shadowdance, etc.
 Keith Baker, (born 1969) freelance author of Dungeons & Dragons
 R. Scott Bakker, (born 1967) author of the Prince of Nothing series
 Josiah Bancroft, author of Senlin Ascends
 Catherine Banner, (born 1989) author of The Last Descendants series
 James Barclay, (born 1965) author of Chronicles of the Raven and Legends of the Raven, both trilogies
 Leigh Bardugo, author of Six of Crows
 Clive Barker, (born 1952) author of The Books of Abarat series
 M. A. R. Barker, (1929–2012) author of the Tékumel series
 William Barnwell, (born 1943) author of the Blessing Papers series
 J. M. Barrie, (1860–1937) author of Peter Pan
 T. A. Barron, (born 1952) author of Merlin Effect and The Lost Years of Merlin
 Samit Basu, (born 1979) author of The Simoqin Prophecies and The Manticore's Secret
 Gael Baudino, (born 1955) author of Dragonsword and Duel of Dragons
 L. Frank Baum, (1856–1919) author of the Land of Oz series
 Peter S. Beagle, (born 1939) author of The Last Unicorn and A Fine and Private Place
 Elizabeth Bear, (born 1971) author of Hammered
 Bradley Beaulieu, author of The Lays of Anuskaya and The Song of the Shattered Sands series
 Frank Beddor, author of The Looking Glass Wars
 John Bellairs, (1938–1991) author of The Face in the Frost and The House with a Clock in Its Walls
 Hans Bemmann, (1922–2003) author of The Stone and the Flute and Erwins Badezimmer
 Robert Jackson Bennett, (born 1984) author of The Divine Cities series
 Stella Benson, (1892–1933) author of Living Alone
 Carol Berg
 Ari Berk, (born 1967) author of the Undertaken Trilogy
 Steve Berman, editor in the field of queer speculative fiction 
 Julie Bertagna, (born 1962) author of the Spark Gap series
 Anne Bishop, author of the Black Jewels Trilogy
 Holly Black, (born 1971) co-author of (with Tony DiTerlizzi) The Spiderwick Chronicles and Arthur Spiderwick's Field Guide to the Fantastical World Around You
 James P. Blaylock, (born 1950)
 Enid Blyton, (1897–1968) author of The Enchanted Wood and The Magic Faraway Tree
 Aliette de Bodard, (born 1982) author of Obsidian and Blood series
 Maya Kaathryn Bohnhoff, (born 1954) author of The Meri
 Pseudonymous Bosch, author of The Secret Series of books
 Hannes Bok, (1914–1964) illustrator and author of The Sorcerer's Ship
Natasha Bowen, author of Skin of the Sea
 Paula Brackston, author of The Witch's Daughter
 Ray Bradbury, (1920–2012) author of Fahrenheit 451 and Something Wicked This Way Comes
 Marion Zimmer Bradley, (1930–1999) author of the Darkover series and editor of the Sword and Sorceress series of anthologies
 Rebecca Bradley, author of The Lady in Gil
 Gillian Bradshaw, (born 1956) author of Hawk of May (also writes historical fiction and science fiction novels)
 Ernest Bramah, (1868–1942) author of the Kai Lung stories
 Libba Bray, (born 1964) author of the Gemma Doyle Trilogy
 Marie Brennan, author of Doppelganger
 Peter V. Brett, (born 1973) author of The Painted Man and The Desert Spear
 Rae Bridgman, author/illustrator of The MiddleGate Books - The Serpent's Spell, Amber Ambrosia, Fish & Sphinx
 Patricia Briggs, (born 1965) author of Moon Called and sequels
 Kristen Britain, author of the Green Rider novels
 C. Dale Brittain, (born 1948), author of the Yurt novels
 Maurice Broaddus, author of The Knights of Breton Court trilogy
 Terry Brooks, (born 1944) author of the Shannara novels, Magic Kingdom of Landover novels and Word & Void series
 Roseanne A. Brown, (born 1995) author of A Song of Wraiths and Ruin
 Howard Browne, (1908–1999)
 Steven Brust, (born 1955) author of the Dragaera novels
 Col Buchanan, (born 1973) author of Farlander and Stands a Shadow
 Michael Buckley, (born 1969) author of The Sisters Grimm series
 Lela E. Buis
 Lois McMaster Bujold, (born 1949) author of The Curse of Chalion and its sequels
 Emma Bull, (born 1954) author of War for the Oaks
 Kenneth Bulmer, (1921–2005) author of the Dray Prescot series
 Chris Bunch, (1943–2005) author of Dragon Master Trilogy
 Arthur J. Burks, (1898–1974)
 Edgar Rice Burroughs, (1875–1950) author of the Tarzan novels
 Jim Butcher, (born 1971) author of Dresden Files and Codex Alera novels

C 

 Rachel Caine, (1962–2020) author of the Weather Warden and Morganville Vampires novels
 James Branch Cabell, (1879–1958) author of Biography of the Life of Manuel
 Miles Cameron, author of the Traitor Son Cycle
 Trudi Canavan, (born 1969) author of the Age of the Five novels
 Orson Scott Card, (born 1951) author of Ender's Game and Hart's Hope
 Jacqueline Carey, (born 1964) author of Kushiel's Legacy and The Sundering
 Isobelle Carmody, (born 1958) author of the Obernewtyn Chronicles and The Gathering
 Jonathan Carroll, (born 1949) author of The Land of Laughs and Bones of the Moon
 Lewis Carroll, (pseudonym of Charles Lutwidge Dodgson 1832–1898) author of Alice in Wonderland
 Angela Carter, (1940–1992) author of Shadow Dance
 Lin Carter, (1930–1988) editor of the Ballantine Adult Fantasy series and author of The Wizard of Lemuria
 Sebastien de Castell, author of Traitor's Blade and sequels
 Vittorio Catani, (1940–2020)
 Beth Cato, (born 1980)
 Juraj Červenák, (born 1974)
 Mark Chadbourn, (born 1960) author of The Age of Misrule series
 Soman Chainani, (born 1979) author of The School for Good and Evil  series
 Jack L. Chalker, (1944–2005) author of Midnight at the Well of Souls
 S. A. Chakraborty, author of The City of Brass
 Robert W. Chambers, (1865–1933) author of The King in Yellow
 Karen Chance, author of the Cassandra Palmer and Dorina Basarab novels
 Joy Chant, (born 1945) author of Red Moon and Black Mountain
 J. Kathleen Cheney, (born 1964)
 C. J. Cherryh, (born 1942) author of The Fortress Series
 G. K. Chesterton, (1874–1936) author of The Man Who Was Thursday
 Cinda Williams Chima, (born 1952) author of The Heir Chronicles
 Zen Cho, (born 1986) author of Sorcerer Royal series
 Massimo Citi, (born 1955)
 Cassandra Clare, (born 1973), author of The Mortal Instruments
 C. L. Clark, author of The Unbroken
 P. Djèlí Clark, (born 1971) author of A Master of Djinn
 Susanna Clarke, (born 1959) author of Jonathan Strange & Mr Norrell
 Adrian Cole, (born 1949) author of the Dream Lords series
 Myke Cole, author of The Sacred Throne series
 Sara Coleridge, (1802–1852) author of  Phantasmion
 Eoin Colfer, (born 1965) author of the Artemis Fowl series
John Collier, (1901–1980)
 Suzanne Collins, (born 1962) author of The Hunger Games, Catching Fire and Mockingjay
 Brendan Connell, (born 1970)
 Storm Constantine, (1956–2021) author of the Wraeththu series
 Glen Cook, (born 1944) author of The Black Company novels and Garrett P.I. novels
 Hugh Cook, (1956–2008) author of the Chronicles of an Age of Darkness
 Rick Cook, (1944–2022) author of the Wizardry series
 Louise Cooper, (1952–2009) author of The Book of Paradox
 Susan Cooper, (born 1935) author of The Dark Is Rising Sequence
 Larry Correia, author of the Monster Hunter series and founder of the Sad Puppies movement
 John Crowley, (born 1942) author of Little, Big
 Lilith Saintcrow, (born 1976) Strange Angels series
 Elaine Cunningham, (born 1957) author of the Songs & Swords series
 Jane Louise Curry, (born 1932) author of the Abaloc series

D 

 Roald Dahl, (1916–1990) author of Charlie and the Chocolate Factory and James and the Giant Peach
 James Dashner, author of The Maze Runner
 Avram Davidson, (1923–1993) author of The Phoenix and the Mirror
 Sylvia Day, (born 1973) author of Bared to You
 Adam James Dalton, (born 1970) author of the Flesh & Bone Trilogy
 Pamela Dean, (born 1953) author of Tam Lin
 John DeChancie, (born 1946) author of the Castle Perilous series
 L. Sprague de Camp, (1907–2000) author of The Compleat Enchanter & Conan stories
 Alessandro Defilippi
 Michael de Larrabeiti, (1934–2008) author of The Borrible Trilogy
 Charles de Lint, (born 1951) author of The Borderland Series
 Kathryn Deans, author of Shimmer
 Tom Deitz, (1952–2009) author of the David Sullivan series
 Joseph Delaney, (born 1945) author of The Wardstone Chronicles
 Samuel R. Delany, (born 1942) author of the Return to Nevèrÿon series
 Troy Denning, (born 1958) author of Dark Sun (Dungeons & Dragons) and Star Wars books
 Graham Diamond, (born 1949) author of The Haven
 Seth Dickinson, author of The Traitor Baru Cormorant
 Tony DiTerlizzi, (born 1969) co-author of (with Holly Black) The Spiderwick Chronicles and Arthur Spiderwick's Field Guide to the Fantastical World Around You
 Stephen Donaldson, (born 1947) author of The Chronicles of Thomas Covenant
 Kevin Donoghue, (born 1967) author of From The Devil We Came, The Adventures of Robyn Nudd, The Rise of Germania and Svengali Junior
 Carole Nelson Douglas, (1944–2021) author of the Sword and Circlet, Taliswoman, and Delilah Street series as well as Irene Adler Sherlockian suspense novels
 Sara Douglass, (1957–2011) author of Wayfarer Redemption
 Ann Downer, (born 1960) author of the Spellkey series
 David Drake, (born 1945) author of the Lord of the Isles series
 Tobias Druitt, author of Corydon and the Island of Monsters
 Diane Duane, (born 1952) author of the Young Wizards novels
 Dave Duncan, (1933–2018) author of West of January
 Brian Lee Durfee, author of The Forgetting Moon
 Lord Dunsany, (1878–1957) (Edward Plunkett) author of The King of Elfland's Daughter
 Jeanne DuPrau, (born 1944) author of The City of Ember
 David Anthony Durham, (born 1969) author of Acacia: The War With The Mein

E 
 David Eddings, (1931–2009) author of Belgariad, Malloreon, Elenium, Tamuli and The Dreamers novels
 E. R. Eddison, (1882–1945) author of The Worm Ouroboros
 C. M. Eddy, Jr., (1896–1967) author of Exit Into Eternity: Tales of the Bizarre and Supernatural
 Graham Edwards, (born 1965) writer of the Dragoncharm and Stone and Sky trilogies
 Phyllis Eisenstein, (1946–2020), author of Shadow of Earth and Born to Exile
 Mircea Eliade, (1907–1986) author of Bengal Nights
 Kate Elliott, (born 1958) author of the Crown of Stars series
 Harlan Ellison, (1934–2018) anthologist and author of Mefisto in Onyx
 Ernest Elmore, (1901–1957) author of The Lumpton Gobbelings
 Michael Ende, (1929–1995) author of The Neverending Story
 Steven Erikson, (born 1959) author of the Malazan Book of the Fallen
 Lloyd Arthur Eshbach, (1910–2003) author and proprietor of Fantasy Press
 Javier Abril Espinoza, (born 1967)
 Ian Cameron Esslemont, (born 1962) author of the Novels of the Malazan Empire series
 Jennifer Estep, author of Elemental Assassin series and Crown of Shard series
 Rose Estes, creator of the Endless Quest gamebook series

F 

 Karina Fabian,  (born 1967) 
 Jennifer Fallon, (born 1959) author of Medalon
 Nancy Yi Fan, (born 1993) author of Swordbird
 David Farland (occasional pen name of Dave Wolverton), (1957–2022) author of The Runelords series
 Nancy Farmer, (born 1941) author of The Sea of Trolls
 Philip Jose Farmer, (1918–2009) author of the Riverworld saga
 Christine Feehan, author of the Dark series
 Raymond E. Feist, (born 1945) author of the Riftwar Saga
 Jean-Louis Fetjaine, (born 1956)
 Jasper Fforde, (born 1961) author of the Thursday Next series
 Charles G. Finney, (1905–1984) author of The Circus of Dr. Lao
 Eliot Fintushel, (born 1948) author of Breakfast with the Ones You Love
 John Flanagan, (born 1944) author of the Ranger's Apprentice series
 Lynn Flewelling, (born 1958) author of The Nightrunner Series
 Eric Flint, (born 1947) author of the Belisarius series and creator of "1632 series"
 John M. Ford, (1957–2006) author of The Dragon Waiting
Namina Forna, (born 1987) author of The Gilded Ones
 Kate Forsyth, (born 1966) author of The Witches of Eileanan series
 Alan Dean Foster, (born 1946) author of the Humanx Commonwealth novels, particularly those involving Flinx
 Laura Frankos, (born 1960)
 Steven Frankos, author of The Wheel Trilogy
 Jackie French, (born 1953) author of  Somewhere Around the Corner and Tajore Arkle
 C. S. Friedman, (born 1957) author of Black Sun Rising
 Cornelia Funke, (born 1958) author of the Inkheart series, The Thief Lord, and Dragon Rider
 Maggie Furey, (born 1955) author of The Artefacts of Power series

G 

 Diana Gabaldon, (born 1952) author of the Outlander series
 Neil Gaiman, (born 1960) author of novels, short stories, The Books of Magic and other graphic novels
 Sara Gallardo, (1931–1988) author of Enero ("January") and El País del Humo ("Country of the Smoke")
 Craig Shaw Gardner, (born 1949) author of the Dragon Circle series and film novelizations
 Richard Garfinkle (fl. 1990s) author of All of an Instant
 Alan Garner, (born 1934) author of Elidor and The Weirdstone of Brisingamen
 Richard Garnett, (1835–1906) author of The Twilight of the Gods and Other Tales
 Randall Garrett, (1927–1987) author of the Lord Darcy novels
 David Gemmell, (1948–2006) author of the Drenai novels
 Mary Gentle, (born 1956) author of Rats and Gargoyles
 ElizaBeth Gilligan, author of Magic's Silken Snare and The Silken Shroud
 Laura Anne Gilman, author of the VineArt trilogy, the Cosa Nostradamus series and the Devil's West series
Heather Gladney, (born 1957) author of Teot's War and others
Parke Godwin, (1929–2013) author of The Last Rainbow, Sherwood, Firelord
 Christie Golden, (born 1963) author of Vampire of the Mists and books set in the universes of Star Trek, Warcraft, Star Wars and others
 Christopher Golden, (born 1967) co-author (with Mike Mignola) of Baltimore, or The Steadfast Tin Soldier and the Vampire; books set in the Buffy the Vampire Slayer universe; and non-Buffy novels in the Ghosts of Albion series with Buffy actress Amber Benson
 Julia Golding, (born 1969) author of the Companions Quartet and the Cat Royal series
 Terry Goodkind, (1948–2020) author of The Sword of Truth novels
 A. T. Greenblatt
 Gayle Greeno, (born 1949) author of Finders Seekers
 Ed Greenwood, (born 1959) author of The Elminster Series
 Jim Grimsley, (born 1955) author of the high fantasy novel Kirith Kirin
 Lev Grossman, (born 1969) author of The Magicians (Grossman novel)
 Jeff Grubb, (born 1957) author of the Finder's Stone trilogy with Kate Novak
 Gary Gygax, (1938–2008) author of Dungeons and Dragons, other game rules, and fantasy books

H 

 Andrea Hairston, (born 1952) author of Redwood and Wildfire
 Barbara Hambly, (born 1951) author of Those Who Hunt the Night
 Greg Hamerton, (born 1973) author of the Tale of the Lifesong series
 Laurell K. Hamilton, (born 1963) author of the Anita Blake: Vampire Hunter series
 Traci Harding, (born 1964) author of The Ancient Future Trilogy
 Lyndon Hardy, (born 1941) author of Master of the Five Magics
 Charlaine Harris, (born 1951) author of The Southern Vampire Mysteries series, which HBO adapted as the TV series True Blood
 Geraldine Harris, (born 1951) Egyptologist and author of Prince of the Godborn
 Edith Ogden Harrison, (1862–1955) author of Prince Silverwings
 Kim Harrison (pen name of Dawn Cook), (born 1966) author of the Rachel Morgan / The Hollows series
 M. John Harrison, (born 1945) author of works set in the fictional city of Viriconium; literary editor of the New Wave science fiction magazine New Worlds
 Alix E. Harrow, (born 1989) author of The Ten Thousand Doors of January
 Petra Hartmann, (born 1970)
 Simon Hawke, (born 1951) author of The Wizard of 4th Street
 Hayami Yuji, (born 1961)
 Elizabeth Haydon, (born 1965) author of the Symphony of Ages series
 Markus Heitz, author of "The Dwarves" series
 Bernhard Hennen, (born 1966)
 Frank Herda, (born 1947) author of The Cup of Death: Chronicles of the Dragons of the Magi
 Tracy Hickman, (born 1955) author of the Dragonlance novels
 Jim C. Hines, (born 1974) author of The Goblin Master's Grimoire
 Robin Hobb, (born 1952) pseudonym of Margaret Astrid Lindholm Ogden who also writes as Megan Lindholm; author of Assassin's Apprentice
 John C. Hocking, (born 1960) author of Conan and the Emerald Lotus
 P. C. Hodgell, (born 1951) author of God Stalk
 William Hope Hodgson, (1877–1918) author of The House on the Borderland
 E. T. A. Hoffmann, (1776–1822) author of "The Nutcracker" and other fantastic stories
 Wolfgang Hohlbein, (born 1953) author of Magic Moon
 Robert Holdstock, (1948–2009) author of Mythago Wood
 Tom Holt, (born 1961) writes mostly humorous fantasy, such as Who's Afraid of Beowulf?; also writes as K. J. Parker
 Nina Kiriki Hoffman, (born 1955) author of The Thread That Binds the Bones
 Nalo Hopkinson, (born 1960) author of Brown Girl in the Ring
 Anthony Horowitz, (born 1955) author of The Power of Five series and Groosham Grange
 Elaine Horseman, (1925–1999) author of Hubble's Bubble, The Hubbles' Treasure Hunt and The Hubbles and the Robot
 Robert E. Howard, (1906–1936) creator of Conan the Barbarian
 Tanya Huff, (born 1957) author of Blood Price
 Barry Hughart, (1934–2019) author of Chinese historical fantasies such as Bridge of Birds
 Robert Don Hughes, (born 1949)
 Stephen Hunt, author of the Jackelian novels (steampunk; beginning with The Court of the Air)
 Faith Hunter, author of the Rogue Mage series, the Jane Yellowrock series, and (soon) the Soulwood trilogy
 Kameron Hurley, author of the Worldbreaker Saga

I 
Eva Ibbotson, (1925–2010) Which Witch? and The Secret of Platform 13
Jordan Ifueko (born 1993) author of Raybearer
Ian Irvine, (born 1950) The View from the Mirror
Ralf Isau, (born 1956)
James Islington, (born c. 1981) author of The Shadow of What Was Lost and sequels
Francisco Javier Illán Vivas (born 1958)

J 
 Benedict Jacka, author of the Alex Verus series
 Steve Jackson, co-author of many Fighting Fantasy books
 Brian Jacques, (1939–2011) author of the Redwall series
 L. Dean James, (1947–2018) author of Sorcerer's Stone
 Tove Jansson, (1914–2001) author of the Moomin novels
 N. K. Jemisin, (born 1972) author of The Hundred Thousand Kingdoms and The Fifth Season, along with their sequels
 K. V. Johansen, (born 1968) author of Torrie and the Dragon
 Carrie Jones, author of the Need series and After Obsession
 Diana Wynne Jones, (1934–2011) author of the Chrestomanci series and Howl's Moving Castle
 Howard Andrew Jones, author of The Chronicles of Sword and Sand series and the Ring-Sworn trilogy
 Ivan Jones, author of The Ghost Hunter series
 J. V. Jones, (born 1963) author of Sword of Shadows series
 Robert Jordan (pseudonym of James Oliver Rigney, Jr.), (1948–2007) author of The Wheel of Time series
 Graham Joyce, (1954–2014)

K 

 Lene Kaaberbøl, (born 1960) author of The Shamer Chronicles 
 Lauren Kate, (born 1981) author of The Fallen series
 Guy Gavriel Kay, (born 1954) author of The Fionavar Tapestry and Tigana
 Paul Kearney, (born 1967) author of the Monarchies of God series
 David Keck, author of the Durand Col series
 Sylvia Kelso, author of The Rihannar Chronicles
 Debra A. Kemp, (1957–2015) author of Arthurian novels The Firebrand and The Recruit
 Paul S. Kemp, author of Twilight Falling (set in the world of the Forgotten Realms, and based on the Dungeons & Dragons role-playing game)
 Katharine Kerr, (born 1944) author of the Deverry novels and others
 Greg Keyes, (born 1963) author of The Kingdoms of Thorn and Bone series
 Caitlín R. Kiernan, (born 1964) author of Tales of Pain and Wonder
 Stephen King, (born 1947) author of The Eyes of the Dragon and The Dark Tower Series
 Russell Kirkpatrick, (born 1961) author of Fire of Heaven trilogy
 Mindy L. Klasky, author of The Glasswrights' Apprentice
 Annette Curtis Klause, (born 1953) author of The Silver Kiss
 Richard A. Knaak, (born 1961) contributor of books to the series Dragonlance, Warcraft, and others
Vernon Knowles (1899–1968), The Street of Queer Houses and other Tales (1924)
 Mary Robinette Kowal, (born 1969) author of Shades of Milk and Honey
 Feliks W. Kres (a pseudonym of Witold Chmielecki), (born 1966) 
 R.F. Kuang, (born 1996) author of The Poppy War
 Michael Kurland, (born 1938) author of The Unicorn Girl
 Katherine Kurtz, (born 1944) author of the Deryni novels
 Ellen Kushner, (born 1955) author of Thomas the Rhymer
 Henry Kuttner, (1915–1958)

L 

 Mercedes Lackey, (born 1950) author of the Velgarth/Valdemar novels
 R. A. Lafferty, (1914–2002) author of Fourth Mansions
 Sterling E. Lanier, (1927–2007) editor; author of The Peculiar Exploits of Brigadier Ffellowes
 Victor LaValle, (born 1972) author of The Changeling
 Stephen R. Lawhead, (born 1950) author of In the Hall of the Dragon King
 Mark Lawrence (author), (born 1966) author of The Broken Empire Trilogy 
 Mary Soon Lee, (born 1965) author of The Sign of the Dragon
 Tanith Lee, (1947–2015) author of the Tales from the Flat Earth series
 Lee Yeongdo, (born 1972) author of the Dragon Raja
 Fonda Lee, (born 1979) author of The Green Bone Saga
 Yoon Ha Lee, (born 1979) author of Phoenix Extravagant
 Ursula K. Le Guin, (1929–2018) author of the Earthsea novels
 Fritz Leiber, (1910–1992) author of the Fafhrd and the Gray Mouser stories
 Valery Leith, (born 1968) pseudonym of Tricia Sullivan
 R. B. Lemberg, (born 1976) author of The Four Profound Weaves and The Unbalancing
 Madeleine L'Engle, (1918–2007) author of A Wrinkle in Time
 C.S. Lewis, (1898–1963) author of The Chronicles of Narnia series, The Space Trilogy, and The Screwtape Letters
 Astrid Lindgren, (1907–2002), author of Pippi Longstocking
 Megan Lindholm, (born 1952) pseudonym of Margaret Astrid Lindholm Ogden who also writes as Robin Hobb
 David Lindsay, (1876–1945) author of A Voyage to Arcturus
 Jane Lindskold, (born 1962) author of the Firekeeper saga
 Holly Lisle, (born 1960) author of The Secret Texts and Korre series
 Ken Liu, (born 1976)
 Ian Livingstone, co-author of many Fighting Fantasy books
 H. P. Lovecraft, author of the Cthulhu Mythos
 Ruth Frances Long, (born 1971) author of The Treachery of Beautiful Things
 James Lowder, (born 1963) author of Prince of Lies and Knight of the Black Rose
 Helen Lowe, (born 1961) author of the Heir of Night series
 Lois Lowry, (born 1937) author of The Giver and Gathering Blue
 Elizabeth A. Lynn, (born 1946) author of The Chronicles of Tornor
 Patricia Lynch, (1894–1972) author of The Turf-cutter's Donkey
 Scott Lynch, (born 1978) author of The Gentleman Bastard sequence

M 

 Sarah J. Maas, (born 1986), author of Throne of Glass series
 Julian May, (1931–2017)
 R. A. MacAvoy, (born 1949) author of Tea with the Black Dragon
 George MacDonald, (1824–1905) author of Lilith
 D. J. MacHale, (born 1956) author of the Pendragon series
 Arthur Machen, (1863–1947) author of The Great God Pan
 Violette Malan, author of The Mirror Prince
 Lisa Mantchev, author of Eyes Like Stars
 Juliet Marillier, (born 1948) author of the Sevenwaters Trilogy
 Stephen Marley, author of the Chia Black Dragon series
 George R. R. Martin, (born 1948) author of A Song of Ice and Fire
 Thomas K. Martin, (born 1960)
 John Masefield, (1878–1967)
 Anne McCaffrey, (1926–2011) author of the Dragonriders of Pern series
 Brian McClellan, author of The Powder Mage trilogy
 Seanan McGuire, (born 1978) author of Rosemary and Rue; also writes as Mira Grant (Feed)
 Fiona McIntosh, (born 1960) author of The Quickening series
 Juliet E. McKenna, (born 1965) author of The Thief's Gamble 
 Dennis L. McKiernan, (born 1932) author of The Iron Tower
 Patricia A. McKillip, (born 1948) author of The Riddle-Master of Hed
 Richelle Mead, (born 1976) author of the Vampire Academy and the Bloodlines series
 Robin McKinley, (born 1952) author of the Damar stories
 John Meaney, (born 1957) author of Bone Song
 O. R. Melling, author of The Hunter's Moon
 Abraham Merritt, (1884–1943) author of The Moon Pool
Shannon Messenger, author of Keeper of the Lost Cites
 Gustav Meyrink, (1868–1932) author of The Golem
 Marissa Meyer, (born 1984) author of The Lunar Chronicles series
 Stephenie Meyer, (born 1973) author of the Twilight series
 China Miéville, (born 1972) author of Perdido Street Station
 Karen Miller, author of The Innocent Mage
 A.A. Milne, (1882–1956) author of Winnie-the-Pooh and The House at Pooh Corner
 Hope Mirrlees, (1887–1978) author of Lud-in-the-Mist
 L. E. Modesitt, Jr., (born 1943) author of the Recluce novels
 Elizabeth Moon, (born 1945) author of The Deed of Paksenarrion
 Michael Moorcock, (born 1939) author of Eternal Champion sequence
 Christopher Moore, (born 1957) author of Practical Demonkeeping
 Caiseal Mór, author of 12 novels including The Wanderers and The Watchers trilogies.
 A. R. Morlan (1958–2016) author of Of Vampires & Gentlemen: Tales of Erotic Horror
 John Morressy, (1930–2006) author of The Domesticated Wizard
 Chris Morris, (born 1946)
 Janet Morris, (born 1946)
 Kenneth Morris, (1879–1937)
 William Morris, (1834–1896) author of The Wood Beyond the World and The Well at the World's End
 Tamsyn Muir, (born 1985) author of Gideon the Ninth
 H. Warner Munn, (1903–1981) author of Merlin's Ring
 C. E. Murphy, (born 1973) author of Coyote Dreams
 Pat Murphy, (born 1955) author of The Falling Woman
 Gary Myers, (born 1952) author of The House of the Worm
 John Myers Myers, (1906–1988) author of Silverlock

N 

 Robert Nathan, (1894–1985) author of Portrait of Jennie
 Geoff Nelder, (born 1947) author of Exit, Pursued by a Bee
 Robert Newcomb, author of A March into Darkness
 Mark Charan Newton (born 1981), author of The Legends of the Red Sun
 William Nicholson, (born 1948) author of The Wind Singer
 Douglas Niles, author of the Watershed trilogy and other series
 Jenny Nimmo, (born 1944) author of Children of the Red King and The Magician Trilogy
 Larry Niven, (born 1938) author of The Magic May Return
 Garth Nix, (born 1963) author of Sabriel and sequels
 Charles Nodier, (1790–1844)
 Alyson Noël, author of Evermore
 John Norman, (born 1931) author of the Gor series
 Claire North, pseudonym for Catherine Webb, author of The First Fifteen Lives of Harry August
 Andre Norton, (1912–2005) author of High Sorcery
 Kate Novak, author of the Finder's Stone trilogy with Jeff Grubb
 Naomi Novik, author of the Temeraire series
 Jody Lynn Nye, author of the Mythology 101 series and co author of the MythAdventures series with Robert Asprin.
 Eric S. Nylund, (born 1964)

O 
 Raven Oak, (born 1977) author of the Boahim Series 
 Andrew Offutt, (1934–2013)
 Noriko Ogiwara
 Nnedi Okorafor, (born 1974) author of Akata Witch and Who Fears Death
 Tochi Onyebuchi, (born 1987) author of the Beasts Made of Night series and Riot Baby
 Karen Osborne (born 1980)
 Thomas Owen

P 

 Norvell W. Page, (1904–1961)
 Christopher Paolini, (born 1983) author of the Inheritance Cycle
 Richard Parks, (born 1955)
 Michelle Paver, author of The Chronicles of Ancient Darkness series
 Diana L. Paxson, (born 1943) author of Brísingamen
 Mervyn Peake, (1911–1968) author of the Gormenghast series
 Frank E. Peretti, (born 1951) author of This Present Darkness and The Oath
 Anne Perry, (born 1938) author of Tathea
 Nick Perumov, (born 1963) author of Ring of Darkness, Chronicles of Hjorward and Keeper of Swords series
 Uroš Petrović, (born 1967)
 Eden Phillpotts, (1862–1960) author of Lycanthrope: The Mystery of Sir William Wolf
 Meredith Ann Pierce, (born 1958) author of The Darkangel Trilogy
 Tamora Pierce, (born 1954) author of the Tortall books, The Song of the Lioness series and the Circle of Magic books
 Ricardo Pinto, (born in 1961) author of The Stone Dance of the Chameleon series
 Tim Powers, (born 1952) author of The Anubis Gates
 Anne Plichota, author of Oksa Pollock
 C. L. Polk, (born 1969) author of The Kingston Cycle
 Terry Pratchett, (1948–2015) author of Discworld
 Fletcher Pratt, (1897–1956) author of The Well of the Unicorn
E. Hoffmann Price (1898–1988)
 Philip Pullman, (born 1946) author of His Dark Materials trilogy

R 

 Jean Ray, pseudonym of Raymundus Joannes de Kremer (1887–1964), Belgian fantasist 
 Melanie Rawn, (born 1954) author of Dragon Prince
 Philip Reeve, author of Mortal Engines Quartet and Fever Crumb series
 Mickey Zucker Reichert, (pseudonym of Miriam Susan Zucker Reichert, born 1962) author of the Renshai series, based on Norse mythology
 Anne Rice, (1941–2021) author of The Vampire Chronicles
 L. James Rice (born 1968) author of the Sundering the Gods Saga
 Rick Riordan, (born 1964) author of the Percy Jackson and the Olympians and Heroes of Olympus series
 Rebecca Roanhorse, (born 1971) author of the Between Earth and Sky series
 Jennifer Roberson, (born 1953) author of the Sword-Dancer Saga
 Katherine Roberts, (born 1962) author of The Echorium Sequence trilogy
 Nora Roberts, (born 1950) author of The Circle Trilogy
 Kenneth Robeson, (pseudonym of Lester Dent among others) Doc Savage stories
 Michael Scott Rohan, (1951–2018) author of the Winter of the World series
 Joel Rosenberg, (1954–2011) author of the Guardians of the Flame series
 Patrick Rothfuss, (born 1973) author of The Name of the Wind
 Veronica Roth, author of Divergent series
 M. A. Rothman
 J. K. Rowling, (born 1965) author and writer of the Harry Potter and Fantastic Beasts series 
 Don Roff, (born 1966) author of Zombies: A Record of the Year of Infection
 Christopher Ruocchio
 Kristine Kathryn Rusch, (born 1960) Fey series and others, former editor of F&SF
 Sean Russell, (born 1952) author of Moontide and Magic Rise
A. Merc Rustad, (born 1986)
 Anthony Ryan, author of the Raven's Shadow series
 Jessica Rydill, (born 1959) author of Children of the Shaman

S 

 Fred Saberhagen, (1930–2007) author of the Empire of the East, The Swords and The Lost Swords series
 Michelle Sagara, author of the Sundered series
 Angie Sage, author of the Septimus Heap series
 Jessica Amanda Salmonson, (born 1950) author of the Tomoe Gozen series
 R.A. Salvatore, (born 1959) author of the Drizzt novels
 Margit Sandemo, (1924–2018)
 Brandon Sanderson, (born 1975) author of the Mistborn and The Stormlight Archive series
 Andrzej Sapkowski, (born 1948) author of Witcher short stories and novels
 Charles R. Saunders, (1946–2020) author of Imaro
 Lawrence M. Schoen, (born 1959) author of the Conroyverse series
 V.E. Schwab, pseudonym for Victoria Schwab (born 1987), author of Shades of Magic trilogy
 Darrell Schweitzer, (born 1952)
 Michael Scott, (born 1959) author of The Secrets of the Immortal Nicholas Flamel series
 Martin Scott, (born 1959) author of "Thraxas"
 Darren Shan, author of The Saga of Darren Shan, The Demonata and short stories
 Samantha Shannon, (born 1991) author of The Priory of the Orange Tree
 Robert Sheckley, (1928–2005)
 Mary Shelley, (1797–1851) author of Frankenstein and short stories
 Will Shetterly, (born 1955) author of Dogland
 Tony Shillitoe, (born 1955) author of The Andrakis Trilogy
 Sharon Shinn, (born 1957) author of The Twelve Houses series
 Gary Shipman, (born 1966) author of Pakkins' Land
 Rhoda Shipman, (born 1968) author of Pakkins' Land
 Robert Silverberg, (born 1935) author of the Majipoor series
 William Mark Simmons (Wm. Mark Simmons), (born 1953)
 Johanna Sinisalo, (born 1958)
 Isaac Bashevis Singer, (1902–1991)
 Sharon Skinner, (born 1956) author of The Healer's Legacy and others
 Clark Ashton Smith, (1893–1961) one of "the big three of Weird Tales, along with Robert E. Howard and H. P. Lovecraft"; author of Out of Space and Time
 Guy Smith, (born 1957)
 L.J. Smith, (born 1965) author of the Night World, The Vampire Diaries and The Secret Circle series
 Mark Andrew Smith, author of The New Brighton Archeological Society
 Sherwood Smith, (born 1951) author of Inda (novel) and Wren to the Rescue
 Thorne Smith, (1892–1934) author of Topper, on which a 1937 comedy film was based
 S. P. Somtow (pseudonym of Somtow Sucharitkul, born 1952), author of Vampire Junction
 Alison Spedding, (born 1962) author of The Road and the Hills
 Wen Spencer, (born 1963) author of Elfhome
 Nancy Springer, (born 1948) author of The White Hart
Jon Sprunk (born 1970)
 Michael A. Stackpole, (born 1957) author of A Secret Atlas; best known for his Star Wars and BattleTech books
 Christopher Stasheff, (1944–2018) author of The Warlock in Spite of Himself
 Brian Staveley, author of the Chronicles of the Unhewn Throne
 Brooke Stevens, author of The Circus of the Earth and the Air
 Mary Stewart, (1916–2014) author of The Crystal Cave
 Paul Stewart, author of The Edge Chronicles
 Caroline Stevermer, (born 1955) author of The Serpent's Egg
 Maggie Stiefvater, (born 1981) author of The Raven Cycle
 Frank R. Stockton, (1834–1902) author of "The Lady, or the Tiger?"
 James Stoddard, author of The High House
 Adrian Stone, (born 1958) author of Devil Trilogy
 David Lee Stone, author of The Illmoor Chronicles
 Charles Stross, (born 1964) 
 Jonathan Stroud, author of The Bartimaeus Trilogy
 Tricia Sullivan, (born 1968) writes fantasy as Valery Leith (The Company of Glass)
 Michael J. Sullivan, (born 1961) author of The Riyria Chronicles
 Thomas Burnett Swann, (1928–1976) author of The Day of the Minotaur
 Michael Swanwick, (born 1950) author of The Iron Dragon's Daughter and sequels
 Jonathan Swift, (1667–1745) author of Gulliver's Travels
 Mitzi Szereto, author of In Sleeping Beauty's Bed: Erotic Fairy Tales and editor of Thrones of Desire: Erotic Tales of Swords, Mist and Fire

T 

 Graeme K. Talboys, author of Stealing into Winter
 Yoshiki Tanaka, author of The Heroic Legend of Arslan
 Charles R. Tanner, (1896–1974) author of Angus MacAuliffe and the Gowden Tooch
 Judith Tarr, (born 1955) author of The Hound and the Falcon
 Roger Taylor, author of the Chronicles of Hawklan
 Adrian Tchaikovsky, author of the Shadows of the Apt series
 Tais Teng, (born 1952) author of "Palimpsests"
 Sheri S. Tepper, (1929–2016) author of The True Game series
 Karin Tidbeck, (born 1977) author of Jagannath
 Lavie Tidhar, (born 1976) author of A Man Lies Dreaming
 Patrick Tilley, (1928–2020) author of The Amtrak Wars series
 Eldon Thompson, (born 1974) author of The Legend of Asahiel series
 Kate Thompson, (born 1956) author of Switchers
 Tade Thompson, author of the Wormwood Trilogy
 J. R. R. Tolkien, (1892–1973) author of The Hobbit, The Lord of the Rings and The Silmarillion
 Megan Whalen Turner, (born 1965), author of The Thief (Turner novel)
 Harry Turtledove, (born 1949) author of the Videssos series and Darkness series

U 
 Unno Juza, (1897–1949)

V 
 Eric van Lustbader, (born 1946) author of The Pearl Saga
 Jack Vance, (1916–2013) (John Holbrook Vance) author of the Dying Earth series and the Lyonesse Trilogy
 Jules Verne, (1828–1905) author of Around the World in Eighty Days and Twenty Thousand Leagues Under the Sea
E. C. Vivian (1882–1947)

W 

 Tim Waggoner, author of Thieves of Blood
 Karl Edward Wagner, (1945–1994) author of Kane
 Mervyn Wall, (1908–1997) author of The Unfortunate Fursey
 Evangeline Walton, (1907–1996) author of Prince of Annwn
 Jo Walton, (born 1964) author of Among Others
 Freda Warrington, author of Elfland, A Taste of Blood Wine, the Blackbird sequence, Dracula the Undead, Dark Cathedral, and others
 Lawrence Watt-Evans, (born 1954) author of Out of This World
 Catherine Webb, (born 1986) author of Mirror Dreams
 David Weber, (born 1952) author of Oath of Swords
 Helene Wecker, author of The Golem and the Jinni
 Brent Weeks, (born 1977) author of The Way of Shadows
 Margaret Weis, (born 1948) co-author of several Dragonlance books
 Manly Wade Wellman, (1903–1986) author of Worse Things Waiting
 Angus Wells, (1943–2006) author of Forbidden Magic
 Martha Wells, (born 1964) author of City of Bones and The Books of the Raksura
 Django Wexler, author of The Shadow Campaigns
 Suzanne Weyn, (born 1955) author of children's and young adult science fiction and fantasy novels and numerous film novelizations
 Chuck Whelon, (born 1969) cartoonist and creator of the humorous fantasy webcomic serial "Pewfell"
 E. B. White, (1899–1985) author of Charlotte's Web and Stuart Little
 T.H. White, (1906–1964) (Terence Hanbury White) author of The Once and Future King
 Jack Whyte, (1940–2021) author of Arthurian novels such as The Skystone
 Cherry Wilder, (1930–2002) author of The Wanderer
 Paul O. Williams, (1935–2009)
 Tad Williams, (born 1957) author of the Memory, Sorrow, and Thorn trilogy
 Terri Windling, (born 1958) author of The Borderland Series
 David Wingrove, author of Chung Kuo (novel series)
 Evan Winter, author of The Rage of Dragons
 Cendrine Wolf, author of Oksa Pollock
Gene Wolfe, (1931–2019) author of The Shadow of the Torturer
 Chris Wooding, author of Poison
 Patricia Wrede, author of the Lyra books
 John C. Wright, (born 1961) author of the Orphans of Chaos and Last Guardian of Everness series
 Kirby Wright, author of The End, My Friend
 Janny Wurts, author of the Wars of Light and Shadow and the Empire Trilogy (with Raymond E. Feist)

Y 
 Yamamura Bocho
 Neon Yang, author of The Black Tides of Heaven
 Nicholas Yermakov, (original name of Simon Hawke; born 1951) 
 Jane Yolen, (born 1939) author of Briar Rose

Z 
 Roger Zelazny, (1937–1995) author of The Chronicles of Amber
 Alexander Zelenyj
 Sarah Zettel, (born 1966) author of A Sorcerer's Treason

See also
Fantasy
List of children's literature writers
List of fantasy novels
List of high fantasy fiction
List of horror fiction authors
List of science fiction authors
Lists of authors

References

External links
 website for Science Fiction and Fantasy Writers of America

Fantasy
Authors